Persatuan Sepakbola Indonesia Kota Banjar or Persikoban (en: Football Association of Indonesia of Banjar City) is an Indonesian association football club from Banjar, West Java. Persikoban plays in Liga 3.

References

Banjar, West Java
Football clubs in West Java
Football clubs in Indonesia
Association football clubs established in 2003
2003 establishments in Indonesia